Bradford Armory, is a historic National Guard armory located in Bradford, Pennsylvania, in McKean County. It was listed on the National Register of Historic Places on May 9, 1991.

It was built in 1912 for Company C, 16th Infantry of the Pennsylvania National Guard. It was purchased by John Schenne, a prominent land owner and engineer at the start of the 2014 summer for $60,000. The yellow brick,  building was designed in the Romanesque Revival style.

See also 
 National Register of Historic Places listings in McKean County, Pennsylvania

References 

Infrastructure completed in 1912
Armories on the National Register of Historic Places in Pennsylvania
Pennsylvania National Guard
Romanesque Revival architecture in Pennsylvania
Buildings and structures in McKean County, Pennsylvania
1912 establishments in Pennsylvania
National Register of Historic Places in McKean County, Pennsylvania